Virden is a city in Macoupin and Sangamon counties in the U.S. state of Illinois. The population was 3,231 at the 2020 census.

The Macoupin County portion of Virden is part of the St. Louis, Missouri–Illinois Metropolitan Statistical Area, while the Sangamon County portion is part of the Springfield Metropolitan Statistical Area.

Virden was the scene of an 1898 coal miners' strike, during which Mary Harris "Mother" Jones played a major role.

History
Virden sits atop a large seam of coal. After the 1850s, when the Chicago and Alton Railroad was completed, it became possible to mine Virden coal and ship it long distances for a profit. Throughout the second half of the 1800s, Virden prospered and grew as a coal-mining town.

A bitter coal strike broke out in 1898. The Chicago-Virden Coal Company, fearing loss of key business in Chicago, refused to allow its Virden mines to be unionized, nor would it pay the nonunionized miners union-scale wages.  Instead, the coal company built a timber stockade around its mine head, adjoining the railroad tracks, and hired African-Americans from Southern states as coal miners. The Chicago-Virden Company knew that African-Americans, who were attempting to escape Jim Crow labor conditions, would not request union-scale wages. Instead, the company promised to pay their new workers by the ton. The new miners were promised only 30 cents per ton of coal mined.

The appearance of the African-American miners infuriated the strikers. They were motivated by racism, by labor solidarity, and by the desire to create decent lives for their own families. Some of the striking coal miners were themselves African-American, and black coal miners who were union members in good standing were apparently accepted by their unionized white comrades. However, this acceptance did not extend to strikebreakers.

Battle of Virden

On October 12, 1898, a northbound train, loaded with potential strikebreaking miners, pulled into Virden and stopped on the tracks just outside the minehead stockade. The mine manager and train operator, knowing there would be trouble, had reinforced the train with a troop of security guards, armed with Winchester rifles. It soon became clear that the security guards had been either ordered, or allowed, to shoot to kill. As the strikers attempted to surround the train, the guards opened fire.

As a gun battle broke out in and around the strikebreakers' train, there were dead and wounded on both sides. Of the thirteen dead, six were security guards. Furthermore, had the strikers won the battle, their intentions toward the Alabama strikebreakers were not friendly. After twenty minutes of firing on both sides, the train's engineer accepted defeat and the engine and part of the train pulled away from the minehead and continued northward to Springfield.   
 
A monument in the Virden town square commemorates the coal strike of 1898 and the battle of October 12 that was its bitter end. The monument contains a large bronze bas-relief that includes the names of those killed, and a copy of a mendacious recruiting handbill distributed by the Chicago-Virden Company in Birmingham, Alabama, to recruit the African-American miners. The body of the bas-relief is made of symbolic representations of the Chicago & Alton tracks and the assault on the strikers. The guards are shown pointing their Winchesters at the strikers and their families. Atop the bas-relief is a bronze portrait of Mary Harris Jones ("Mother Jones"), who is buried in nearby Mount Olive.

Geography
Most of the city lies in the northeast corner of Macoupin County, with a small portion extending north into Sangamon County. In the 2000 census, 3,378 of the city's 3,488 residents (96.8%) lived in Macoupin County and 110 (3.2%) lived in Sangamon County.

Illinois Route 4 passes through the city as Springfield Street, leading southwest  to Carlinville, the Macoupin county seat, and northeast  to Springfield, the state capital.

The city drains west to Sugar Creek and east to its tributary Brush Creek. Both creeks flow to the northeast, with Sugar Creek joining the Sangamon River, a tributary of the Illinois River, east of Springfield.

Demographics

As of the census of 2000, there were 3,488 people, 1,455 households, and 934 families residing in the city. The racial makeup of the city was 98.80% White, 0.32% African American, 0.40% Native American, 0.09% Asian, 0.06% from other races, and 0.34% from two or more races. Hispanic or Latino of any race were 0.46% of the population.

There were 1,455 households, out of which 29.8% had children under the age of 18 living with them, 49.8% were married couples living together, 10.6% had a female householder with no husband present, and 35.8% were non-families. 31.0% of all households were made up of individuals, and 14.8% had someone living alone who was 65 years of age or older. The average household size was 2.32 and the average family size was 2.87.

In the city, the population was spread out, with 23.9% under the age of 18, 8.4% from 18 to 24, 26.5% from 25 to 44, 21.3% from 45 to 64, and 19.9% who were 65 years of age or older. The median age was 39 years. For every 100 females, there were 88.2 males. For every 100 females age 18 and over, there were 82.7 males.

The median income for a household in the city was $31,905, and the median income for a family was $41,511. Males had a median income of $30,824 versus $22,121 for females. The per capita income for the city was $16,541. About 7.4% of families and 10.7% of the population were below the poverty line, including 12.0% of those under age 18 and 9.3% of those age 65 or over.

Notable people
Warren Ambrose, professor emeritus of mathematics at the Massachusetts Institute of Technology and at the University of Buenos Aires
Julian N. Frisbie, decorated brigadier general, USMC, during World War II and later Warden of Southern Michigan Prison
Edward Alsworth Ross, sociologist, eugenicist, and major figure of early criminology
Henry Calvert Simons, economist at the University of Chicago
Luella Wilcox St. Clair Moss, suffragist, one of the first female college presidents in the U.S.; born in Virden
Melvin Vaniman, aviator and photographer who specialized in panoramic images

References

Further reading
 David Markwell. "A Turning Point: the Lasting Impact of the 1898 Virden Mine Riot," Journal of the Illinois State Historical Society, Volume: 99. Issue: 3/4. 2006. pp 211+. online edition
 Rosemary Feuer. "Remember Virden! The Coal Mines Wars of 1898-1900." Illinois History Teacher, Volume 13:2, 2006, pp. 10–22. online edition

External links

 

Cities in Illinois
Cities in Macoupin County, Illinois
Cities in Sangamon County, Illinois
Cities in Springfield metropolitan area, Illinois